Programming is a form of music production and performance using electronic devices and computer software, such as sequencers and workstations or hardware synthesizers, sampler and sequencers, to generate sounds of musical instruments. These musical sounds are created through the use of music coding languages. There are many music coding languages of varying complexity. Music programming is also frequently used in modern pop and rock music from various regions of the world, and sometimes in jazz and contemporary classical music. It gained popularity in the 1950s and has been emerging ever since.

Music programming is the process in which a musician produces a sound or "patch" (be it from scratch or with the aid of a synthesizer/sampler), or uses a sequencer to arrange a song.

Coding languages 
Music coding languages are used to program the electronic devices to produce the instrumental sounds they make. Each coding language has its own level of difficulty and function.

Alda

The music coding language Alda provides a tutorial on coding music and is, "designed for musicians who do not know how to program, as well as programmers who do not know how to music". The website also has links to install, tutorial, cheat sheet, docs, and community for anyone visiting the website.

LC

LC computer music programming language is a more complex computer music programming language meant for more experienced coders. One of the differences between this language and other music coding languages is that, "Unlike existing unit-generator languages, LC provides objects as well as library functions and methods that can directly represent microsounds and related manipulations that are involved in microsound synthesis."

History and development 
Music programming has had a vast history of development leading to the creation of different programs and languages. Each development comes with more function and utility and each decade tends to favor a certain program and or piece of equipment.

MUSIC N 
The first digital synthesis family of computer programs and languages being MUSIC-N created by Max Mathews. The development of these programs, allowed for more flexibility and utility, eventually leading them to become fully developed languages. As programs such as MUSIC I, MUSIC II and MUSIC III were developed, which were all created by Max Matthews, new technologies were incorporated in such as the table-lookup oscillator in MUSIC II and the unit generator in MUSIC III. The breakthrough technologies such as the unit generator, which acted as a building block for music programming software, and the acoustic compiler, which allowed "unlimited number of sound synthesis structures to be created in the computer", further the complexity and evolution of music programming systems.

Drum machines 
Around the time of the 1950s, electric rhythm machines began to make way into popular music. These machines began to gain much traction amongst many artists as they saw it as a way to create percussion sounds in an easier and more efficient way. Some of the popular artists who used this kind of technology are the following: J. J. Cale, Sly Stone, Phil Collins, Marvin Gaye, and Prince. Some of the popular drum machines through the time of the 50s-70s were the Side Man, Ace Tone's Rhythm Ace, Korg's Doncamatic, and Maestro's Rhythm King. In 1979, the LM-1 drum machine computer was released by the guitarist, Roger Linn, and its goal was to help artists achieve realistic sounding drum sounds. This drum machine had 8 different drum sounds: kick drum, snare, hi-hat, cabasa, tambourine, two tom toms, two congas, cowbell, clave, and handclaps. The different sounds could be recorded individually and they sounded real because of the high frequencies the sound (28 kHz). Some notable artists who used the LM-1 drum machine were Peter Gabriel, Stevie Wonder, Michael Jackson, and Madonna. These developments continued to happen in future decades leading to the creation of new electrical instruments such as the Theremin, Hammond organ, electric guitar, synthesizer, and digital sampler. Other technologies such as the phonograph, tape-recorder, and compact disk has enabled artists to create and produce sounds without the use of live musicians.

Music programming in the 1980s

The music programming innovations of the 1980s brought many new unique sounds to this style of music. Popular music sounds during this time were the gated reverb, synthesizers, drum machines with 80s sounds, vocal reverb, delay, and harmonization, and master bus mix downs and tape. Music programming began to emerge around this time which drew up controversy. Many artists were adapting more towards this technology and the traditional way music was made and recorded began to change. For instance, many artists began to record their beats by programming instead of recording a live drummer.

Music programming in the late 2000s

Today, music programming is prevalent amongst almost every artist. Most of them use software on their computer or laptop to produce music and do not actually use physical instruments. These different programs are called digital audio workstations (DAW) and are used for editing, recording, and mixing, music files. Most DAW programs incorporate the use of MIDI technology, which allows for music production software to carry out communication between electronic instruments, computers, and other related devices. While most DAWs carry out the same function and do the same thing, there are some that require less expertise and are easier for beginners to operate. These programs are run on PC’s, and the top 12 most popular DAWs now are as follows: FL Studio, Avid Pro Tools, Apple Logic Pro X, Magix Acid Pro, Ableton Live, Presonus Studio One, Magix Samplitude Pro X, Cockos Reaper, Propellerhead Reason, Steinberg Cubase Pro, GarageBand, and Bitwig Studio.

Equipment
Technology: digital audio workstation, drum machine, groovebox, sampler, sequencer, synthesizer and MIDI

References

External links
 

Electronic music
Musical techniques